Kyle and Carrick was one of nineteen local government districts in the Strathclyde region of Scotland from 1975 to 1996.

History
The district was created in 1975 under the Local Government (Scotland) Act 1973, which established a two-tier structure of local government across Scotland comprising upper-tier regions and lower-tier districts. Kyle and Carrick was one of nineteen districts created within the region of Strathclyde. The district covered the whole area of seven former districts and parts of another two from the historic county of Ayrshire, which were all abolished at the same time:
Ayr Burgh
Ayr District (except the part within the designated area of Irvine New Town)
Dalmellington District (part, being Coylton and that part of the parish of Ayr within that district - rest of district to Cumnock and Doon Valley)
Girvan Burgh
Girvan District
Maybole Burgh
Maybole District
Prestwick Burgh
Troon Burgh

The district bordered districts of Cunninghame, Kilmarnock & Loudoun and Cumnock and Doon Valley Districts of Strathclyde to its north and east as well as Stewartry and Wigtown Districts in Dumfries & Galloway.

In 1974 Alistair Irving Haughan was appointed Chief Architect of Kyle & Carrick District Council, holding the post until he retired in December 1990. While Haughan was in post the work the Council undertook on the restoration of Tam o' Shanter's bridge, the Brig O' Doon in Alloway won a Stone Federation Award.

The district was abolished in 1996 by the Local Government etc. (Scotland) Act 1994 which replaced regions and districts with unitary council areas. South Ayrshire council area was formed with identical boundaries to Kyle and Carrick District.

Political control
The first election to the district council was held in 1974, initially operating as a shadow authority alongside the outgoing authorities until it came into its powers on 16 May 1975. Political control of the council from 1975 was as follows:

Premises
The district council's headquarters were in Ayr, where they established offices in Burns House in Burns Statue Square with a satellite office in a two storey, 19th century villa at 30 Miller Road.

See also
 Carrick
 Kyle
 Subdivisions of Scotland

References

 

Districts of Scotland
Politics of South Ayrshire
Carrick, Scotland
Kyle, Ayrshire